Stanislava Škvarková (born 20 April 1996) is a Slovak athlete. She competed in the women's 100 metres hurdles event at the 2019 World Athletics Championships.

References

External links

1996 births
Living people
Slovak female hurdlers
Place of birth missing (living people)
World Athletics Championships athletes for Slovakia